White Pine Beach is a beach on Sasamat Lake in Belcarra Regional Park in Port Moody, British Columbia. TransLink provides seasonal bus service.

Beaches of British Columbia
Port Moody